Kent Williams may refer to:

Kent Williams (artist) (born 1962), American graphic novel artist
Kent Williams (actor) (born 1950), American stage and television actor
Kent Williams (voice actor), American voice actor for FUNimation
Kent Williams (politician) (born 1949), Tennessee House of Representative
Kent M. Williams (born 1960), South Carolina politician